Sergei Vytautovich Puskepalis (15 April 1966 – 20 September 2022) was a Russian actor and theatre director. He is best known for his roles in the award-winning movies Simple Things (2006) and How I Ended This Summer (2010), both directed by Alexei Popogrebski. For his performances, he won a Nika Award for Best Actor in 2008, as well as a Silver Bear for Best Actor at the 60th Berlin International Film Festival in 2010.

Early life
Sergei Puskepalis was born in 1966 to a Lithuanian father and a Bulgarian mother from Transnistria, in Kursk, then Soviet Union.

Sergei studied in Saratov, the Saratov Drama School, then went on active duty in the Soviet Navy, worked as an actor in the Saratov Youth Theatre, studied at the Russian Institute of Theatre Arts, he graduated in 2001.

After graduating from the Moscow GITIS, he staged the play "Twenty-Seven" Alexey Slapovsky and this performance was one of the festival Baltic House. Afterwards, he put on the play by Alexey Slapovsky "From red to green rat star" in Omsk "Fifth theater". Sergei Puskepalis repeatedly staged performances of Slapovsky's plays.

He worked as a director in the Samara theater "Monday".
From May 2003 to 2007 Sergei Puskepalis - chief director of the Magnitogorsk Drama Theatre named after A. S. Pushkin. 2007 - production director of the Moscow theater studio under the direction of Oleg Tabakov. From June 2009 to February 2010 - chief director of the Russian State Academic Drama Theater named after Fyodor Volkov in city of Yaroslavl.

Puskepalis was invited to many famous Russian drama theaters to stage theater productions.

Career
In 2003 Puskepalis started to act in movies. His first role was a cameo in the film The Stroll. Sergei Puskepalis met the film director Alexei Popogrebski on the set of the film Roads to Koktebel, in which his son, actor Gleb Puskepalis, played. Later Popogrebski invited Sergei Puskepalis to star roles in the films Simple Things and How I Ended This Summer.

In 2015, the film Clinch which Sergei Puskepalis made as a film director had its premiere at the Yerevan International Film Festival. The picture is an adaptation of the play by Alexey Slapovsky which Sergei Puskepalis staged in Ufa.

Puskepalis was an active supporter of the 2022 Russian invasion of Ukraine.

Personal life and death
Sergei Puskepalis married Elena in 1991. Their son Gleb Puskepalis was born in 1992.
Sergei Puskepalis died on 20 September 2022 at the age of 56, in Yaroslavl Oblast in a car accident. He was driving an armored minibus to Donetsk, with the intention of giving it to the formations of the Donetsk People's Republic.

Filmography

References

External links

1966 births
2022 deaths
People from Kursk 
Road incident deaths in Russia
Russian male film actors
Russian male stage actors
Russian theatre directors
Russian film directors
Silver Bear for Best Actor winners
Recipients of the Nika Award
21st-century Russian male actors
Russian people of Lithuanian descent
Russian people of Bulgarian descent
Honored Artists of the Russian Federation